Dunkirk is a city in Chautauqua County, New York, United States. It was settled around 1805 and incorporated in 1880. The population was 12,743 as of the 2020 census. Dunkirk is bordered on the north by Lake Erie. It shares a border with the village of Fredonia to the south, and with the town of Dunkirk to the east and west. Dunkirk is the westernmost city in the state of New York.

History
The Iroquoian languages-speaking Erie people occupied this area of the forested lakefront along the southern shore of Lake Erie well into the 1600s, when Europeans, mostly French, started trading around the Great Lakes. They were pushed out by the Seneca people, one of the Five Nations of the powerful Iroquois League, based here and further east in New York.
The European-American demarcation and settlement of Chadwick Bay and subsequent naming of Dunkirk - after Dunkirk in France - began in earnest in 1826.

The Dunkirk Lighthouse at Point Gratiot was built soon after and still stands. Dunkirk served as a minor railroad hub and steamship port on Lake Erie into the early 1900s. Both freight and passenger ships traveled the lakes.

The city has been the site of the Chautauqua County Fair during the summer for more than 140 years, with the fairgrounds in use for sporadic events and functions at other points in the year.

A major employer in Dunkirk in the second half of the 19th century was Brooks Locomotive Works, founded in 1869 by Horatio G. Brooks.  The Brooks plant built almost 4,000 steam locomotives, for which they won several awards at international exhibitions, and a few of their locomotives were hailed as the fastest and largest locomotives in the world. Brooks Locomotive Works was merged into American Locomotive Company in 1901.  The homestead of Horatio G. Brooks became the Brooks Memorial Hospital following a donation by Brooks's daughter in 1898.

The city thrived as a steel town for Roebling and others through the 1950s. In addition, it was a manufacturing leader with Plymouth Tube and Ralston Purina. Its coal-burning Niagara Mohawk Power Corporation plant provided power for the region. The plant was mothballed in 2016, negatively impacting Dunkirk's tax base. NRG Energy acquired the plant and proceeded with plans to convert it from coal-burning to run on natural gas. Since the 1970s, population has declined following a regional drop in manufacturing as the steel industry and other restructured. Overall employment has declined in the area.

Dunkirk gained international recognition in 1946 for the Dunkirk-to-Dunkerque campaign. It was a humanitarian assistance program for its namesake and sister city, Dunkerque, France, which had been devastated in World War II. Dunkirk-to-Dunkerque became the model for similar relief efforts in cities elsewhere in the United States.

Beginning in the 1980s, the city refocused its economic efforts on revitalizing its pier and fishing, to improve the quality of life for residents and attract more tourists. In addition, in 2016 it attracted a high-tech drug manufacturing project as part of business related to the state project of area investment called the "Buffalo Billion."

In 2016, Willie Rosas, a former law enforcement officer, became the first Hispanic to be elected mayor in the State of New York.

Geography

Demographics

As of the census of 2010, there were 12,563 people, 5,477 households, and 3,690 families residing in the city. The population density was 2,774.6 people per square mile (1,119.2 per km2). There were 6,071 housing units at an average density of 1,340.6 per square mile (517.4 per km2). The city's racial makeup of the city was 65.70% White, 5.1% Black or African American, 0.52% Native American, 0.50 Asian, 0.02% Pacific Islander, 9.14% from other races, and 1.8% from two or more races. Hispanic or Latino of any race were 26.40% of the population.

There were 5,477 households, out of which 28.2% had children under the age of 18 living with them, 39.4% were married couples living together, 16.7% had a female householder with no husband present, and 39.1% were non-families. 33.4% of all households were made up of individuals, and 16.0% had someone living alone who was 65 years of age or older. The average household size was 2.37 and the average family size was 3.02.

In the city, the population was spread out, with 25.3% under the age of 18, 9.0% from 18 to 24, 26.5% from 25 to 44, 21.5% from 45 to 64, and 17.6% who were 65 years of age or older. The median age was 37 years. For every 100 females, there were 90.9 males. For every 100 females age 18 and over, there were 85.8 males.

The median income for a household in the city was $28,313, and the median income for a family was $35,058. Males had a median income of $29,462 versus $21,682 for females. The per capita income for the city was $15,482. About 18.5% of families and 22.3% of the population were below the poverty line, including 38.0% of those under age 18 and 11.1% of those age 65 or over.

Law enforcement and fire/EMS 
The city of Dunkirk has its own police force under the leadership of Police Chief David Ortolano. It employs full-time officers and part-time dispatchers for the police department only.

Dunkirk has a paid fire department under the leadership of Fire Chief Mike Edwards. There are three stations throughout the city staffed by the cities 24 Firefighter/EMT's. The firefighters belong to IAFF Local 616, the union for the city's firefighters.

As of 2011, Dunkirk Fire started handling 90 percent of EMS transports and billing accordingly. Alstar Ambulance still has a reduced contract with the city for advanced life support when needed. In recent years, Dunkirk Fire's dispatching merged with the county dispatch center in Mayville but still maintains its FCC ID of KED 653.

Alstar Ambulance has its north county satellite station on Monroe Street in Dunkirk just southwest of NY 60. Dispatching is still controlled by the main station in Jamestown via MEDCOM. Several transportable units are housed here. There is a fenced-in and pre-lit landing pad on the property for any medevac needing to use the landing pad.

Education
A branch of Jamestown Community College is in Dunkirk.
Dunkirk High School, home of the Marauders, is part of the public Dunkirk City School District.
Northern Chautauqua Catholic School is a K-8th grade school under the Roman Catholic Diocese of Buffalo.

Transportation

The Chautauqua County/Dunkirk Airport, in the town of Dunkirk, provides training facilities and charter services.

Freight railroad service in Dunkirk is provided by CSX Transportation (via the Buffalo-Cleveland-Willard (Ohio)-Chicago Main Line) and Norfolk Southern Railway (Buffalo-Cleveland-Fort Wayne-Chicago Main Line). The Lake Shore Limited daily Amtrak passenger train passes through the city but does not stop. Erie Railroad and New York Central trains stopped at one station. Nickel Plate and Pennsylvania Railroad trains stopped at another station. As recently as 1968 the New York Central operated a Buffalo-Chicago daytime train, #51, the former Empire State Express, that made a stop westbound in Dunkirk. Two other daily trains eastbound stopped in Dunkirk, #64 and #90, the former Chicagoan. In the late 1990s Amtrak considered adding the city as a stop between Buffalo and Erie. Dunkirk was listed as a stop with service "to commence on a date to be announced" on several timetables, but the stop was never added.

The New York State Thruway (Interstate 90) passes through the southern edge of the city, with access from Exit 59 (NY Route 60) just east of the city limits. The Thruway leads northeast  to the outskirts of Buffalo and southwest  to the Pennsylvania border. New York State Route 5 runs through the center of the city, leading northeast  to Silver Creek and southwest  to Westfield. New York State Route 60 runs from Dunkirk south, heading toward Jamestown, New York.

Media
The Observer newspaper is published in Dunkirk.
WDOE AM radio station in Dunkirk, co-owned with Fredonia FM sister station, WBKX.

Climate

Notable people

 

Samuel Hopkins Adams, author
Mark Brazill, creator of That '70s Show
Horatio G. Brooks founder of Brooks Locomotive Works
June Card, operatic soprano and stage director
William L. Carpenter, U.S. Army officer, geologist
Richard H. Cosgriff, Union Army soldier who received the Medal of Honor
Dave Criscione, retired Major League Baseball catcher
Celestine Damiano, former Bishop of Camden
Katharine Bement Davis, social reformer
Mike DiMuro, MLB umpire
Ray DiMuro, retired MLB umpire
Francis S. Edwards, former US congressman
Mike Friedman, pro-racing cyclist
Daniel G. Garnsey, former US congressman 
Dave Graf, retired NFL linebacker
Grasshopper, guitarist and songwriter for seminal alternative rock band Mercury Rev
Ross Graves, former New York politician
Chad Green, former minor league baseball player
H. B. Halicki, director of Gone in 60 Seconds and The Junkman; born in Dunkirk
Norm Hitzges, host on Sportsradio 1310 AM and 96.7 FM the Ticket in the Dallas-Fort-Worth area and Texas Radio Hall of Famer
Thomas Horan, a Medal of Honor Recipient at the battle of Gettysburg (1863) during the Civil War, was born in Dunkirk in 1839 and died 1902. His grave is at Saint Mary's Cemetery in Dunkirk.
Jerry Interval, portrait photographer
Teresa Jordan, geologist at Cornell University
Richard P. Klocko, Air Force lieutenant general, command pilot, director of Defense Communications Agency
John T. McDonough, former Secretary of State of New York
Sean Patrick McGraw, country music artist
Jim McGuire, former MLB player
Mark Merchant, retired minor league baseball player
Cindy Miller, pro golfer
Van Miller, play-by-play announcer for the Buffalo Bills and WIVB-TV sportscaster
Chris Poland, former guitarist of thrash metal band Megadeth
Gar Samuelson, former drummer of thrash metal band Megadeth
William J. Scheyer, Major general in the Marine Corps during World War II
Murray Shelton, member of the College Football Hall of Fame
Wendy Corsi Staub, New York Times best selling author
Elisha Ward, former New York state senator
Cory Wells, One of three lead singers of the band Three Dog Night

See also

Chadwick Bay

References

External links
 
 

Cities in New York (state)
New York (state) populated places on Lake Erie
Cities in Chautauqua County, New York
1805 establishments in New York (state)